John Albert Butler  (a.k.a. Frederick King) (July 26, 1879 in Boston, Massachusetts – February 2, 1950) was a professional baseball player who played catcher from 1901 to 1907. He attended Fordham University and was later a coach for the Chicago White Sox.

External links

1879 births
1950 deaths
Major League Baseball catchers
Brooklyn Superbas players
Fordham Rams baseball players
St. Louis Cardinals players
Milwaukee Brewers (1901) players
Baseball players from Boston
Jersey City Skeeters players
Kansas City Cowboys (minor league) players
Toledo Mud Hens players
Kansas City Blues (baseball) players
Rochester Bronchos players